David Gibson may refer to:

Arts and entertainment
Dave Gibson (American songwriter) (born 1956), country songwriter and member of the Gibson/Miller Band
Dave Gibson (Scottish singer-songwriter), Scottish singer and songwriter
Dave Gibson, jazz drummer with the Count Basie Orchestra
David Warren Gibson, American actor, dancer, choreographer and artist
Dave Gibson (producer) (born 1950s), New Zealand screen producer
David Gibson (photographer) (born 1957), British street photographer and occasional writer on photography
David Cooke Gibson (1827–1856), Scottish painter
David Gibson (Scrabble), American Scrabble player
David Gibson (musician), Canadian pop-rock singer

Politics
David Gibson (Australian politician) (born 1967), Queensland MP
David Gibson (Victorian politician) (1873–1940), Victorian MP
David Gibson (Canadian politician) (1804–1864), surveyor, farmer and political figure in Upper Canada
David Gibson (British politician), Chairman of the Independent Labour Party from 1948 to 1951

Sports
Dave Gibson (Australian footballer) (1879–1953), Australian rules footballer
Dave Gibson (Scottish footballer) (born 1938), Scottish football player most associated with Leicester City
David Gibson (American football) (born 1977), American football safety
David Gibson (cricketer) (1936–2012), Surrey cricketer
David Gibson (footballer, born 1895) (1895–1964), Scottish footballer for Kilmarnock and teams in the United States
David Gibson (footballer, born 1951) (born 1951), Scottish footballer

Others
David Templeton Gibson (1899–1985), British chemist
David R. Gibson (born 1969), American sociologist

See also
David Gibson-Watt, Baron Gibson-Watt (1918–2002), British politician
Gibson (surname)